Habenaria fargesii is a species of plant in the family Orchidaceae. It is endemic to China.

The Latin specific epithet fargesii refers to  the French missionary and amateur botanist Père Paul Guillaume Farges (1844–1912).

References

Endemic orchids of China
fargesii
Vulnerable plants
Taxonomy articles created by Polbot